Perak Football Club or Perak F.C. is a professional football club based in Ipoh. Founded in 1921, the club's home ground since then has been Perak Stadium in Ipoh, Perak. The club represents the state of Perak in Malaysian football competitions. The team is currently playing in the first-tier of Malaysian football, the Malaysia Super League, having been promoted from the Malaysia Premier League after the M-League had been revamped.

The club is often simply referred to as Perak. As with most state football clubs in Malaysia, the state football association has traditionally managed the club. However, in 2016, steps were undertaken to differentiate the association from the club. Between 2016 and 2020, the Perak football team was branded Perak The Bos Gaurus (Perak TBG) F.C.. From 2021 onwards, the club will simply be referred to as Perak F.C.. The acquisition of the club by IMC in 2021 further crystallised the difference between the football association and club.

The club's traditional nickname is Seladang which is Malay for the Gaur which is the club's official mascot. However, in recent times, the team has simply been referred to by the nickname Bos Gaurus.

Perak regular kit colours are yellow and black or white for shirts, shorts and socks.

History
Perak has been represented by a team in Malaya Cup since its inaugural season in 1921. They were also one of the founding members of the Malayan Football Association (the predecessor to the modern Football Association of Malaysia) in 1926. However, the team was not officially registered until 18 April 1951, when the newly formed governing body of Perak football, the Perak Amateur Football Association (PAFA), took over its management.

Perak is the third most successful club in Malaysia Cup history, having won the competition a total of 8 times, with the last of those coming in 2018. It also won the inaugural FA Cup in 1990, a feat it repeated in 2004.

Since Malaysian football league competition was introduced in 1982, the team has emerged league winners twice (in 2002 and 2003) and was the last state team to have never been demoted to a lower division. However, in 2021, Perak had suffered their first relegation from the Malaysian top flight football and will be playing in the Premier League for the first time since 1989. Perak has yet to win the Super League since its foundation in 2004, with its best showing coming in the 2006–07 and 2018 seasons where they finished runners-up.

It made its continental competition debut as a professional team at the 2008 AFC Cup, making it to the Quarter-Final stage before being eliminated by Safa.

Stability and Malaysia Cup success (2016–2020)
In February 2016, the club rebranded as Perak The Bos Gaurus, or Perak TBG, as part of its privatisation plan to play in Malaysia Super League.

Perak subsequently acquired its club license in 2017, in accordance with FMLLP's (currently known as Malaysia Football League) (MFL) requirement for all M-League clubs to acquire their licenses by the start of the 2018 season.

The team won the MALAYSIA Cup in 2018, its first silverware in 12 years. The team also finished second in the Super League, thus qualifying for the following season's AFC Champions League qualifying round. In order to be eligible for participation, Perak successfully acquired an AFC Club License in 2019.

Perak TBG made its Champions League debut on 12 February 2019, making it as far as the third playoff round where it was defeated 1-5 by Ulsan Hyundai.

In 2020, the team was successfully privatised as Perak FC to meet the Football Association of Malaysia (FAM) requirement for state football associations (FA) to be separated from their clubs.

Financial struggles and relegation (2021–2022)
Due to change of government administration and lack of funding from the state .After the abrupt departure of head coach Mehmet Durakovic prior to the start of the 2021 season, it was revealed the team was suffering from serious financial difficulties from RM35mill budget to RM5 mill, with players having gone unpaid for months. By May, the players were said to be refusing to train as a result of unpaid wages.

As a result of poor performances caused by the off-pitch turmoil, Perak's slid towards its first-ever relegation to the Premier League, which was finally confirmed in September.

In November 2021, it was announced that a private broker company called IMC becoming the caretaker of the Perak FC .

In January 2022, Yusri Che Lah, a former Perak player, was appointed the team's fourth head coach in less than a year.

XOX takeover
In August 2022, XOX Bhd completes its 100% stake take over of the club through its subsidiary, XOX Pro Sport Sdn Bhd.

Rivalries 

Perak has a historical derby with Selangor known as the Malayan El Clasico and their rivalry dated back as early as the establishment of the  Malaya Cup (now Malaysia Cup) in the 1920s. 

Perak also had its main rivalry with its northern region’s counterpart, famously known as the Northern Region Derby. Perak’s main rivals are Kedah Darul Aman and Penang FC. Although Perak's main rivals mostly are from the northern region of Malaysia, especially Kedah, but there is also a strong supporter of friendship with Kedah and there are good relations with the fans of Penang and Perlis. "This is Utara” or in english “This is the northern region", is a slogan which shows their good friendships.

Grounds

Perak Stadium

Perak FC's home ground is the Perak Stadium. Built in 1965, the stadium is part of a larger complex located in Kampung Simee in Ipoh, Perak called the DBI Sports Complex, which hosts other sporting facilities such as the Velodrome Rakyat, the Indera Mulia Indoor Stadium, and the Sultan Azlan Shah hockey stadium.

While the stadium's official capacity is 42,500, the club only utilises 32,000 for its home matches. However, after the Perak Stadium has been renovated for 19th Sukma Games in 2018, the capacity of Perak stadium capacity has been reduced to 27,046.

Perak TBG using alternative stadium which is Lumut Stadium whenever Perak Stadium is not available or is under renovation.

Perak Football Complex
In September 2017, the construction of a new training ground for the use of Perak teams of various levels (senior and youth) was announced. 
Originally scheduled for completion in February 2018, the training ground dubbed the Perak Football Complex, was eventually completed in 2020. Located in Chepor, the training ground consists two fields, one synthetic and one natural.

Crest and colours

Crest of Perak FA (1921–2015)
Perak has historically utilised one primary crest. The first, adopted when the club was founded, was the image of a Malayan Tiger, where it is famous in Malaya and remained for more than half-century. In 2015, in effort to modernise the club, a new crest was introduced to replace the old crest as the club main crest. The club replaced the old crest with new logo and adopted the image Seladang which is more synonym with the Perak football team. After being criticized for the lack of quality for the logo, Perak The Bos Gaurus launched a new version of the logo chosen from the logo competition held by the team for 2016 season onwards. Perak reused previous crest for 2019 season for all competitions until 2020 season.

Crest of Perak The Bos Gaurus (2016–2018)
Perak The Bos Gaurus have always worn yellow with a bit of black or white colour shirts as their home kit as it is an iconic colour for the club.

Perak The Bos Gaurus's away colours are usually white and black or various combination colours of white, yellow and black as it represent the colour of Perak's Flag.

Crest of Perak FC (2021–present)

After we choose a brand new Perak FC which create by one of Perak FC fans name Hafiz Ismail after winning Perak FC logo creation competition, he chose to 'redesign' using a round logo due to several factors such as the round shape looks more stable in small or large size.

Besides that, the visibility rate is high if the logo is small, especially for social media. The details will not be easily lost, especially for prints on jerseys and so on and easy to 'invert' and 'outline'.

As for the concept of monogram of PFC which is represented from Perak Football Club with a design like a Gaur head. No team in the Malaysian League competition using this concept of monogram. Therefore, Perak FC became the first to use such a concept and on average used animal symbols or icons.

Supporters
Perak TBG is one of the most widely supported football clubs in Perak. Perak TBG's traditional fanbase comes from all over 11 districts area in Perak. There are also numerous supporters clubs mainly in Perak and also Malaysia.

Silver State Ultras (SSU) is a supporter club founded in April 2009. The group is one of many supporters group created under the branch of Ultras Malaya which was itself founded as a result of the national team's poor performance. The main purpose of SSU is to enhance support of local football among Malaysian football fans. This group is known for bringing drums and large colourful flags to the stadiums alongside of chanting in the stadium in order to raise the spirits of the players and other supporters during matches. Founded in April 2009, the Perak The Yob (PTY) is one of the oldest fan pages on social media in Facebook, Twitter and Instagram.

Ownership and finances
The club were founded in 1921 and owned by Perak Football Association with the financial backing by the state government and sponsors.

The club has its own academy called The Bos Gaurus PAFA Academy or PAFA Academy for short located in Proton City, Tanjung Malim which provide the grassroots football development and youth players for its developmental and youth team.

In August 2022, the corporate company XOX Berhad bought 100% of the shares making it the new owner of the club.

Sponsorship
Perak TBG's kit has been manufactured by AL Sports for 2015, which is contracted to supply the club's kit from 2015 until 2018. In 2019, Perak has got sponsor by Umbro. Then in 2020, Perak got sponsor by Kelme. In 2021, the local sports kit brand, Kaki Jersi has been take place as the brand new sports kit for Perak FC.Kaki Jersi has introduced 32 SKUs for Perak FC’s merchandise.

Perak TBG's current main shirt sponsor is Visit Perak. as shirt sponsor 1 and Pangkor Pulau Bebas Cukai. as shirt sponsor 2. The club has received RM 7.8 million from sponsorship for 2016 season.

Players

Current squad

Reserves and Youth squad

Head coaches
There have been 16 coaches of Perak Darul Ridzuan Football Association since the appointment of the club's first professional coach, Dato' M. Karathu in 1989. The most successful coach of Perak Darul Ridzuan Football Association is Toni Netto from Brazil who had achieved 4 trophies.

Managerial history
Managers by years (1992–present)

Management & coaching staff

Club personnel
As 11 Feb 2023

Current coaching staff
As of Feb 2023

Continental record

Honours

Domestic competitions

League

Malaysian League / Malaysian Semi-Pro Football League Division I / Malaysia Premier League / Malaysia Premier League 1 / Malaysia Super League
Winners (2): 2002, 2003
 Runners-up (2): 2006/07, 2018

Malaysian Semi-Pro Football League Division II / Malaysia Premier League 2 / Malaysia Premier League
 Runners-up (1):  1989

Cup

Malaysia FA Cup
 Winners (2): 1990, 2004
 Runners-up (4): 1991, 2002, 2005, 2019

Malaysia Cup
 Winners (8): 1926, 1931, 1957, 1967, 1970, 1998, 2000, 2018
 Runners-up (11): 1923, 1951, 1959, 1960, 1961, 1964, 1971, 1972, 1974, 2001, 2007

Sultan Haji Ahmad Shah Cup
 Winners (3): 1999, 2005, 2006
 Runners-up (2): 2001, 2019

Preseason Competitions

Unity Shield
 Winners (1): 2020
 Runners-up (1): 2019

Federal Territory Minister Cup

 Runners-up (1): 2023

Club records

Updated on 11 November 2021 (Malaysian football league was established in 1982).

Note:

Pld = Played, W = Won, D = Drawn, L = Lost, F = Goals for, A = Goals against, Pts= Points, Pos = Position

Source:

Individual player awards

Favourite Striker Award

Overall Favourite Player Award

M-League Golden Boots – Top Goalscorer Overall

M-League Perak FA's League Top Goalscorer

All-time top goalscorer

Club captains history

Presidential history

See also

 Perak FA President and Youth

Notes

References

External links
 Official Website
 The Bos Gaurus PAFA Academy Website
 The Bos Gaurus PAFA Academy Official Facebook

 
Malaysia Super League clubs
Football clubs in Malaysia
Malaysia Cup winners
Football associations in Malaysia
1951 establishments in Malaya
Sports organizations established in 1951